The Secret Mark of D'Artagnan is a 1962 Italian-French adventure film written and directed  by Siro Marcellini and starring George Nader and Magali Noël.

The film is about the adventures of D'Artagnan in the year 1632, between The Three Musketeers and Twenty Years After.

Plot

Cast 
 George Nader as D'Artagnan
 Magali Noël as Carlotta
 Georges Marchal as Duke of Montersant
 Alessandra Panaro as Diana
 Mario Petri as Porthos 
 Massimo Serato as Cardinal Richelieu
 Franco Fantasia as Duke of Savignac
 Giulio Marchetti as King Louis
 Piero Pastore as Conspirator
 Raf Baldassarre  
 Tullio Altamura

References

External links

1962 adventure films
Italian adventure films
French adventure films
Films directed by Siro Marcellini
Italian swashbuckler films
Films based on The Three Musketeers
Films scored by Carlo Rustichelli
Films set in the 1630s
Cultural depictions of Cardinal Richelieu
1960s Italian-language films
1960s Italian films